Joe Chiccarelli is an American record producer, mixer and engineer, who is a native of Boston, Massachusetts, and has been active since the 1980s.  He has produced albums by Stan Ridgway, Morrissey, Oingo Boingo, Spoon, The Shins, Sandra Bernhard, My Morning Jacket, Counting Crows, Augie March, Manchester Orchestra, Minus the Bear, Boy & Bear, Kurt Elling, Saints of Valory, and Big Talk. Other artists include Elton John, Rufus Wainwright, U2, Alanis Morissette, Beck, Etta James, Jamie Cullum, Al Stewart, Tori Amos, The Strokes, The Killers, Cage The Elephant, Cafe Tacuba, Pink Martini, The Shelters, Christina Perri, Third Eye Blind, Vanessa Carlton, Rachael Yamagata, Michael Buble', Glenn Frey and Jason Mraz.

Chiccarelli also engineered Frank Zappa's albums Sheik Yerbouti, Joe's Garage Acts I, II & III and Tinseltown Rebellion, and engineered the White Stripes 2007 album Icky Thump. He also engineered The Raconteurs, Consolers of the Lonely, for which he received his eighth of ten Grammy awards, for Best Engineered Album of 2008. He is responsible for album sales well over 50 million.

Career
Chiccarelli got his first taste of the studio through a cousin who owned Boston's Fleetwood Studio. He also worked as an engineer at Music Designers Recording Studio in Boston. Chiccarelli moved west where he scored an assistant engineer gig at L.A.'s Cherokee Studios.  He got his career break engineering Frank Zappa's album Sheik Yerbouti. In an interview with HitQuarters, Chiccarelli said: "[Zappa's] engineer couldn't make the session and so he decided to take a chance on me. I'm so thankful ever since that day because he gave me a career."

He is credited with discovering singer Tori Amos and signing her first band, Y Kant Tori Read, to a label deal. However, Chiccarelli refuted this in an interview with HitQuarters saying, "That's a myth. Tori was already signed to Atlantic Records as a solo artist when I got involved." In 1998, he mixed the Latin album Un Tributo (a José José), a tribute to José José.

In 2009 Chiccarelli produced sessions for Brandi Carlile as well as Minus the Bear's album Omni, released on May 4, 2010. He produced four tracks on The Strokes' fourth album, Angles. He also produced the debut album from Australian group Boy & Bear. The band received five ARIA awards for the album. He also engineered and mixed tracks on Morrissey's Swords album.

In 2011, Chiccarelli produced Jason Mraz's fourth album Love Is a Four Letter Word, released April 17, 2012 and Alanis Morissette's upcoming Havoc and Bright Lights as well as the album Songs of Patience for Alberta Cross. In 2012 he produced what became a Gold album, Departures, for Australian artist Bernard Fanning as well as tracks for Dwight Yoakam. His 2013 album projects include Divine Fits, Hellogoodbye, Saints Of Valory, Plain White T's, Need To Breathe, The Madden Brothers, Number One Charting Australian Album "Greeting from California", and Oxbow. In 2014 he has produced Morrissey's album, World Peace is None of Your Business as well as five songs on Spoon's album They Want My Soul, and tracks with The Rocketboys, Ivan & Alyosha, JEFF the Brotherhood and Victorian Halls. In 2015 he produced a duets album for Doug Seegers and Jill Johnson, becoming a Platinum Number One album in Sweden. 

Album releases in 2016 included releases from Oxbow, Buffalo Sunn, Bleached, Cherry Glazerr, Night Riots, SPEAK and Broken Social Scene. Album sessions in 2017 included Flogging Molly, Jamie Lawson, The Wonders Years, Vance Joy and Morrissey. Album sessions in 2018 included debut album for Rare Americans, new albums for Broken Social Scene, Charly Bliss, Half Moon Run, Morrissey, The Shelters and Run River North. 2019 sessions included Morrissey, The Falls, The Jacks, Rare Americans, Little Dragon, Taylor Janzen and the Juno Award winning album for Half Moon Run's "A Blemish In The Great Light". 2020 Sessions include Didirri, The Dumes, Duncan Laurence, Jagwar Twin, Liily, and Classless Act. 2021 sessions include new albums for The Districts, Michael Bublé and Cayucas. 2022 sessions include Middle Class Rut, Orianthi, Tegan & Sara, The Blue Stones, Robert Randolph and Liz Brasher.

Selected discography

2004
Pink Martini – Hang On Little Tomato (Producer)

2006
Mika – Life in Cartoon Motion (Recorded)

2007
The Shins – Wincing the Night Away (Produce/Record/Mix)
The White Stripes – Icky Thump (Record/Mix)
Castella – How Did We Get Here (Produce/Record/Mix)
Kurt Elling (Concord) – Nightmoves (Produce/Record)
Grace Potter and the Nocturnals (Hollywood) – This Is Somewhere (Engineered)

2008
The Raconteurs – Consolers of the Lonely (Record/Mix)
Georgia (Atlantic) – (Engineered)
My Morning Jacket (ATO) – Evil Urges (Produce/Record)
Augie March (Sony Music Australia) – Watch Me Disappear (Producer)

2009
Ely Guerra (Homey) – Hombre Invisible (Mix)
Cory Chisel (RCA) – Death Won't Send a Letter (Produce/Record/Mix)
Dredg (Universal Germany) – (Mix)
Camera Can't Lie (Atlantic) – (Record)
Ponderosa (New West) – Moonlight Revival (Produce/Record)
Sondre Lerche (Rounder) – Heartbeat Radio (Mix)
Mika (Universal) – The Boy Who Knew Too Much (Record)
Manchester Orchestra (Canvasback) – Mean Everything to Nothing (Produce/Mix)

2010
Adam Stephens (Saddle Creek) – We Live on Cliffs (Produce/Record/Mix)
Minus the Bear (Dangerbird) – Omni (Produce/Record/Mix)
Young the Giant (Roadrunner) – Young the Giant (Produce/Record/Mix)
Juan Campodónico (Universal Latin) – (Record)
Ilse DeLange (Universal Holland) – Next to Me (Record)
Rachael Yamagata (Warner) – (Produce/Record/Mix)
The Killers (Island) – "Boots" (Producer)

2011
The Strokes (RCA) – Angles (Produce/Record)
Big Talk (Anti) – Big Talk (Produce/Record/Mix)
Manchester Orchestra (Columbia) – Simple Math (Produce/Record/Mix)
Gin Wigmore (Universal) – Gravel & Wine (Record/Mix)
Christina Perri (Atlantic) – Produce/Record
Alberta Cross (Ark) – Produce/Record
Boy & Bear (Universal) – Produce/Mix
Tiziano Ferro (EMI Italy) – Record
Jason Mraz (Atlantic) – Produce/Record
Dwight Yoakam (Warner) – Co-produce/Record

2012
Eleni Mandell (YepRoc) – I Can See the Future (Produce/Record/Mix)
Keaton Henson (Sony UK) – Produce/Mix
Cafe Tacuba (Universal) – Co-Produce/Mix
Dropkick Murphys (Born & Bred) – Mix
Alanis Morissette (Collective Sounds) – Produce/Mix
Eleni Mandell (Yep Roc) – Produced/Mix

2013
HelloGoodbye  (OldFriends) - Produce/Mix
Saints of Valory – "Neon Eyes" (Atlantic) – Engineer/Producer
Divine Fits – "Ain't That The Way" (Merge) – Engineer/Producer
Russian Red (Sony) – Produce/Record
Plain White T's – "Should've Gone to Bed" (Hollywood) – Engineer/Produce
Bernard Fanning – Departures – Mixing/Producer

2014
Spoon (Loma Vista/Universal) – Produce/Record
Real Estate "Talking Backwards" (Domino) – Mix
NeedToBreathe  (Atlantic) – Produce/Record
Saints Of Valory (Atlantic) – Produce/Record
Morrissey   (Harvest/Capitol) – Produce/Mix
The Madden Brothers  (Capitol) – Produce/Mix

2015
The Front Bottoms – Back on Top (Atlantic) – Produce/Mix
Jeff The Brotherhood (Warner Bros.) – Produce/Record
Ivan & Alyosha (Dualtone) – Produce/Mix
On An On – And the Wave Has Two Sides(RollCall) – Producer/Engineer/Mixing
Victorian Halls – Hyperalgesia (Victory) – Mixing

2016
Doug Seegers (Universal) – Produce/Mix
Bleached (Secretly Canadian) – Produce/Record
Milow (Universal) – Produce/Record
The Arkells (Universal) – Produce/Record
The Augustines (Universal) – Produce/Mix

2017
Morrissey (BMG) - Produce/Mix
Cherry Glazerr (Secretly Canadian) – Produce/Record
Jamie Lawson (Warner UK) – Produce/Mix
Flogging Molly (Concord) – Produce/Mix
Broken Social Scene (Universal) – Produce/Record
Wildling (Warner Bros) – Produce/Record
Oxbow - Thin Black Duke (HydraHead) – Produce/Mix
Night Riots (Sumerian) – Produce/Mix
Meresha (Sonic Dolphin) – Produce/Mix

2018
The Wonder Year (Hopeless) - Produce/Record
Only Yours (Pirates Blend) - Produce/Record
Vance Joy (Atlantic)"Thinking of You " - Produce/Record
Morrissey (BMG) "Back On the Chain Gang" - Produce/Record/Mix
Ben Hazlewood (MintMusic) "Months & Miles" - Produce/Record
HelloGoodbye (Old Friends) - Mix

2019
Broken Social Scene (Arts & Crafts)EP - Produce
Run River North (Nettwerk) "Hands Up" - Produce/Record
Morrissey (BMG) "California Son" - Produce/Record/Mix
Rare Americans (RA) - Produce/Record
Charly Bliss (Barsuk) "Young Enough" - Produce/Record
The Shelters (Warner Bros) "Jupiter Sidecar" - Produce/Record
2020
Morrissey (BMG) "I Am Not a Dog on a Chain" - Produce/Record/Mix
The Jacks (Universal) "Remember You" - Produce/Record
Half Moon Run (Glassnote) "A Blemish in The Great Light" - Produce/Record
Taylor Janzen (Glassnote) "Ruined Plans" - Produce/Record

2021
The Districts (Fat Possum) "Great American Painting" - Produce/Record/Mix
Half Moon Run (Glassnote) "Seasons of Change"EP - Produce/Record
Liily (Flush) - Produce/Record

1980s and 1990s
Poco – Under the Gun – Engineer/Mix/Record
No Nukes – Engineer/Mix/Record
Frank Zappa – Tinseltown Rebellion (1981) – Engineer
Frank Zappa – [[Shut Up 'n Play Yer Guitar|Shut Up 'n Play Yer Guitar and Shut Up 'n Play Yer Guitar Some More]] (1981) – Engineer/Mix/Record
Oingo Boingo – Only a Lad – Produce/Engineer
Juice Newton – Juice – Engineer/Record
Del Shannon – Drop Down and Get Me – Engineer/Mix
Robert Williams – Buy My Record EP – Producer
Poco – Blue and Gray – Engineer
Red Rider – As Far as Siam – Engineer/Mix/Record
Red Rider – Neruda – Engineer
Willie Phoenix – Willie Phoenix – Produce/Engineer
Juice Newton – Quiet Lies – Engineer/Record
Oingo Boingo – Nothing to Fear – Producer/Engineer/Recording
Fast Times at Ridgemont High – Producer
Toronto – Girls Night Out – Mixing
Juice Newton – Dirty Looks – Mixing
Ray Manzarek – Carmina Burana – Mixing/Mixing Engineer
Frank Zappa – Baby Snakes – Mixing
Glenn Frey – The Allnighter – Mixing
Van Stephenson – Righteous Anger – Engineer/Mixing/Record
Carla Olson / The Textones – Midnight Mission – Engineer/Mixing
Romeo Void – Instincts – Mixing
Poco – Inamorata – Producer/Engineer
Bangles – All Over the Place – Mixing
Vision Quest (Original Soundtrack) – Engineer/Mixing/Record
Pat Benatar – Seven the Hard Way – Producer/Engineer
Vince DiCola – Rocky IV (soundtrack) – Producer, Engineer
Lone Justice – Lone Justice – Engineer/Overdub Engineer/Recording
Taxxi – Expose – Engineer
Todd Sharp – Who Am I? – Mixing
Agent Orange – This Is the Voice – Mixing
The Lover Speaks – The Lover Speaks – Engineer/Mixing/Record
Stan Ridgway – The Big Heat – Producer/Engineer/Mixing
Lone Justice – Shelter – Engineer/Mixing/Co-Producer
Tonio K. – Romeo Unchained – Engineer
Juice Newton – Old Flame – Engineer/Recording
Robert Tepper – No Easy Way Out – Producer
George Thorogood / George Thorogood & the Destroyers – Nadine – Engineer/Mixing/Record
Bob Geldof – Deep in the Heart of Nowhere – Engineer/Mixing/Recording
Cobra – Producer
Julie Brown – Trapped in the Body of a White Girl – Producer
Alison Moyet – Raindancing – Engineer/Recording
Jellybean – Just Visiting This Planet – Engineer/Recording
Breakfast Club – Breakfast Club – Engineer
The Dream Syndicate – 50 in a 25 Zone – Mixing
Tori Amos – Y Kant Tori Read (1988) – Producer/Engineer
Tom Cochrane / Tom Cochrane & Red Rider – Victory Day – Mixing
Joan Baez – Recently – Engineer/Mixing
Al Stewart – Last Days of the Century – Producer
Treat Her Right – Tied to the Tracks – Mixing
Joan Baez – Speaking of Dreams – Mixing
Stan Ridgway – Mosquitos – Producer
James Horner – Field of Dreams – Mixing
Oingo Boingo – Best of Oingo Boingo: Skeletons in the Closet – Producer
Luba – All of Nothing – Producer
Robert Tepper – Modern Madness – Producer
George Thorogood / George Thorogood & the Destroyers – Better Than the Rest – Engineer/Mixing/Record
Hugh Cornwell – Nosferatu – Engineer/Mixing/Record
Frank Zappa – Sheik Yerbouti – Engineer/Remixing/Overdubing
Frank Zappa – Joe's Garage – Engineer/Mixing/Record
Stephen Bishop – Bish – Assistant/Engineer
The Nitty Gritty Dirt Band – Dirt Band – Engineer/Mixing/Record
Journey – Infinity – Engineer/Record
Poco – Legend – Engineer/Mixing
Allen Toussaint – Motion – Assistant/Engineer
Bee Gees – Saturday Night Fever (original soundtrack) – Engineer
José José – Un Tributo (a José José) (1998) – Mixing
Congo Norvell – The Dope, The Lies, The Vaseline'' (1996) – Producer/Engineer/Mixing
American Music Club - "Everclear" - Mixing/Additional Production
American Music Club - "San Francisco" - Producer/Engineer
Steve Wynn - "Kerosene Man" - Producer/Engineer
Steve Wynn - "Dazzling Display" - Producer/Engineer
Rufus Wainwright - "Poses" - Engineer
Julieta Venegas - "Bueninvento" - Producer/Engineer/Mixing

Grammy Awards
2003 Best Latin Rock/Alt Album Café Tacuba "Cuatro Caminos"
2007 Alternative Album The White Stripes "Icky Thump"
2009 Best Engineered Album Non-Classical – The Raconteurs "Consolers of the Lonely"

Latin Grammy Awards
2000 Best Rock Album Cafe Tacuba  "Reves"
2001 Best Rock Solo Vocal Album Juanes  "Fijate Bien"
2003 Best Rock Solo Album Juanes   "Un Dia Normal"
2003 Album of The Year Juanes   "Un Dia Normal"
2004 Best Alternative Album Café Tacuba "Cuatro Caminos"
2010 Best Alternative Album Ely Guerra "Hombres Invisible"
2013 Best Instrumental Album Bajofondo "Presente"

Grammy nominations
Best Alternative Album – The White Stripes "Icky Thump" (Grammy winner)
Best Alternative Album – The Shins "Wincing The Night Away"
Best Jazz Vocal Album – Kurt Elling "Nightmoves"
Best Engineered Album Non-Classical – The Raconteurs "Consolers of the Lonely"
Best Engineered Album Non-Classical - Lorrie Morgan "My Heart"
Best Engineered Album Non-Classical – Cafe Tacuba "Reves YoSoy"
Best Engineered Album Non-Classical – Jason Mraz "Love is a Four Letter Word"
Best Rock Album – The Raconteurs "Consolers of the Lonely"
Best Alternative Album – My Morning Jacket's "Evil Urges"
Producer of The Year" 2007- The Shins, Kurt Elling, Oxbow

References

Record producers from Massachusetts
American audio engineers
Grammy Award winners
Latin Grammy Award winners
Living people
Businesspeople from Boston
Year of birth missing (living people)